The 1963 St. Louis Cardinals season was the 44th season the team was in the National Football League (NFL) and their fourth in St. Louis. The team improved on their previous output of 4–9–1, winning nine games. Despite the improvement, they failed to qualify for the playoffs for the 15th consecutive season.

Schedule

Standings

References

External links 
 1963 St. Louis Cardinals at Pro-Football-Reference.com

1963
St. Louis Cardinals